Grand Prix motorcycle racing is the premier championship of motorcycle road racing, which has been divided into four classes since 2019; MotoGP, Moto2, Moto3, and MotoE. Former classes that are now discontinued include 350cc, 50cc and sidecars. The premier class is MotoGP, which was formerly known as the 500cc class. The Grand Prix Road-Racing World Championship was established in 1949 by the sport's governing body the Fédération Internationale de Motocyclisme (FIM), and is the oldest motorsport World Championship in existence. The motorcycles used in MotoGP are purpose built for the sport, are unavailable for purchase by the general public and cannot be legally ridden on public roads.

Valentino Rossi holds the record for the most race wins in the premier class with 89. Giacomo Agostini is second with 68 wins, and Marc Márquez is third with 59 wins. Dani Pedrosa holds the record for most career wins without winning the championship with 31.

By rider

By nationality

Milestone races winners

Multiples of 100

Most wins per season

References
General
 
 

Specific

Winners